SOS, known in Japan as , is a survival adventure video game developed by Human Entertainment and published in 1994 by Vic Tokai for the Super NES. A sequel to the game was later released in Japan for the PlayStation known as Septentrion: Out of the Blue.

Story
Mostly based on the 1969 book and 1972 film, The Poseidon Adventure, the game is set on September 13, 1921, and the players must escape the sinking ship Lady Crithania, which is hit by a gigantic wave and capsizes off the coast of Humbleton, England.

The game features four playable characters, each with a different story:
 Capris Wisher - An architect. This young man takes his younger stepsister, Amy Markarson, to the Lady Crithania. However, Amy's sickness becomes a severe hindrance to him.
 Redwin Gardner - A counselor, traveling with a family consisting of an unnamed mother and her children Stella and Harry Adams. Plus, Jack Hamilton, a nephew.
 Jeffrey Howell - A senior doctor, he travels along with his wife Adela.
 Luke Haines - A crewman of the Lady Crithania. He suspects that the sea conditions are too much for the Lady Crithania to handle, much to the opposition of his superiors.

Gameplay 

The player must escape from the ship within a one-hour time limit. The timer is hidden except when the player injures themselves, in which case they fall unconscious and lose five minutes of time. After a period of time, the ship begins to periodically tilt in the water and gradually fill with water.

The player can take up to seven other survivors, some of which have different value to each playable character, and all of them have different requirements in how to get to them and how to make them follow the player. Depending on how many survivors the player finds, who they are and how valuable they are to the character player selected, the ending will vary. The best ending for each character is obtained by escaping the boiler room, the final area of the game, with their sentimental person (Amy for Capris; Harry, Stella and Jack for Redwin; Ismay Carl Townsend for Luke; and Adela for Jeffrey) and over 25 "points" worth of survivors.

Release 
The game was released in Japan as Septentrion on May 28, 1993 for the Super Famicom. The game was released in North America April 1994, under the title S.O.S., and was published by Vic Tokai. It was followed up by the Japan-only release of Septentrion: Out of the Blue in 1999 for the Sony PlayStation.

Reception

The game received average reviews upon release. GamePro gave the game a mixed review, saying that the premise is compelling but marred by too many poorly-designed segments. They summarized the game as "a movie-like trek that has great ambiance but hits some sticky spots along the way." In Japan, Famitsu gave it a positive score of 32 out of 40.

Notes

References

External links
 Possible endings for the video game SOS at VGMuseum.com
 SOS instruction manual at the Internet Archive

1993 video games
Human Entertainment games
Naval video games
Super Nintendo Entertainment System games
Super Nintendo Entertainment System-only games
Vic Tokai games
Video games about disasters
Video games developed in Japan
Video games set in the 1920s
Fiction set in 1921
Survival video games
Single-player video games
Video games with alternate endings